Nya (translation: Night) is a Burmese language film which was created by director Htoo Paing Zaw Oo with the new actors and actresses. The film was screened in Myanmar cinemas on 28 July 2017 and re-screened on JCVG cinemas on 18 April 2018 which ended up as one of the highest-grossing films in Myanmar that year.

Htoo Paing Zaw Oo took about three years to write the story and script, prepare for the film and find the new locations. The actors and actresses were chosen among 300 candidates and they received a 150-day training course. Nya is also released as exclusive video-on-demand content on iflix platform on 12 August 2018.

Plot
The film is about the accident between the teenagers. Nyein Thaw, Chan Min and Aung teased Tracy about her crush on Nyein Thaw on April's Fool. She hated them since and try to revenge. Myat Noe who is studying abroad and Russell are sweet couple. Yathaw is Myat Noe's friend who helps them for her wedding. She has a younger brother, Nat Shine Ko who is the son of her father 2nd wife. Yathaw hates Nat Shine Ko and she always quarrels with him. One day, she break the photo album of his mother, Nat Shine Ko acridity  to her. Then, Tracy and Nat Shine Ko meet and they try to  reprisal to each others.

Cast
They use their own names in the film.
Nyein Thaw as Nyein Thaw, a teenager who likes to chase other people.
Aung Ye Htike as Aung Ye Htike, boyfriend of Nan Khay Mo
Chan Min Ye Htut as Chan Min Ye Htut, a millionaire who wants to study in abroad
May Sue Maung as May Sue Maung, girlfriend of Nyein Thaw
Nang Khay Mo as Nang Khay Mo, girlfriend of Aung Ye Htike
Nang Tracy as Nang Tracy, a girl who crush on Nyein Thaw
Net Shine Ko as Net Shine Ko, son of Moe Yathaw's father's 2nd wife
Russell as Russell, Myat Noe Aye's boyfriend
Myat Noe Aye as Myat Noe Aye, Russell's girlfriend
Moe Yathaw as Moe Yathaw, friend of Myat Noe Aye

Notes

References

External links

Burmese thriller films
2017 films
2010s Burmese-language films
Films set in Myanmar
2017 thriller films